Tillandsia neglecta is a species in the genus Tillandsia. This species is endemic to Brazil.

References

neglecta
Endemic flora of Brazil